The Transportation of Dangerous Goods Act (TDGA) is an Act passed in 1992 by the Parliament of Canada. It was assented by Queen Elizabeth through her agent the Governor-General of Canada on 23 June of the same year. The TGDA has an "Offences and Punishments" passage in which are detailed liabilities "on indictment to imprisonment for a term not exceeding two years", and that "Proceedings by way of summary conviction may be instituted at any time within, but not later than, five years after the day on which the subject matter of the proceedings arose." The TGDA falls under the control of the Minister of Transport (Canada).

The Hazardous Waste Manifest form is mandated by the TDGA.

References

Canadian federal legislation
1992 in Canadian law
 
Environment and health
Occupational safety and health